WBCN (770 kHz), branded as "ESPN Southwest Florida", is a commercial AM radio station broadcasting a sports radio format. Licensed to North Fort Myers, Florida, the station is owned by Beasley Broadcast Group, Inc., through licensee Beasley Media Group, LLC.

Using a directional antenna, WBCN broadcasts with 10,000 watts by day. Because 770 kHz is a clear channel frequency reserved for Class A WABC in New York City, WBCN must reduce power at night to 630 watts to avoid interference. The transmitter is off Huffmaster Road in North Fort Myers and the studios and offices are on South Tamiami Trail in Estero, Florida. In addition to its AM signal, WBCN uses two FM translators to air its programming: 104.3 W282BY and 98.1 W251AL, both in Fort Myers.

Programming
WBCN carries Tampa Bay Rays baseball, Tampa Bay Buccaneers football, Florida Gators football and basketball and Westwood One coverage of the National Football League, along with Florida Gulf Coast University basketball. The station has carried Florida Firecats football, Miami Hurricanes football, Florida State Seminoles football, Miami Marlins baseball and Fort Myers Miracle baseball in the past. The station carried Florida Everblades ECHL hockey from their inception to 2009.

WBCN used to broadcast NBA, Major League Baseball, and college football games from ESPN Radio. NASCAR races from Motor Racing Network and Performance Racing Network moved to the then-WWCN from WCKT in 2006. Miami Dolphins games not aired on WRXK-FM, mostly in the preseason, are heard on WBCN, which carried the team full-time before picking up NASCAR.

History
WBCN first signed on the air on December 17, 1983, as big band station WKZY. In 1987, the station was acquired by Beasley Broadcasting, switching the format to oldies as WZRZ. The station also spent time as a soft adult contemporary outlet and also played active rock for a time.

For much of the 1990s and early 2000s, it used the call letters WWCN, originally as a radio affiliate of CNN Headline News and later as a talk station. On June 20, 2013, WWCN began simulcasting the rock music programming on WJBX 99.3 FM, swapping call letters. (AM 770 became WJBX and FM 99.3 became WWCN.)

On June 28, 2013, WJBX dropped its simulcast with WWCN 99.3 FM and switched to Spanish-language sports radio, with programming from the ESPN Deportes Radio Network.

On June 16, 2016, WJBX changed its format back to talk. The station primarily carried nationally syndicated talk shows, including Dave Ramsey, Brian Kilmeade, Hugh Hewitt, Todd Schnitt and This Morning, America's First News with Gordon Deal. Weekend hosts included Larry Elder, Sebastian Gorka, Eric Metaxas, The Jesus Christ Show with Neil Saavedra, and repeats of weekday programs. WJBX carried Townhall News at the start of each hour.

The call sign was changed from WJBX to WBCN on February 5, 2021, with the WJBX call sign being moved to the 1660 AM facility in Charlotte, North Carolina, which had been WBCN. The Charlotte station went silent on December 31, 2020, as the result of the sale of its transmitter site land.

On May 28, 2021, WBCN changed their format from news/talk to sports, branded as "ESPN Southwest Florida", with programming from ESPN Radio; the format moved from WWCN.

Technology
WBCN enjoys the largest daytime coverage area of any AM radio station in Southwest Florida. As a music station (Transtar Radio Networks' "Format 41" and Citadel Broadcasting's "Z-Rock") the station transmitted in AM stereo, using the C-QUAM system. It now incorporates HD radio technology.

Translators
It was announced on July 2, 2012 that Beasley Broadcasting would purchase the two translators from Reach Communications for $150,000, to serve as rebroadcasters for WWCN's sports radio format (via WRXK-HD2): On June 20, 2013, these translators changed their format to alternative rock, relaying WRXK-HD2. Then in 2016, the translators began simulcasting WJBX's talk radio format.

Previous logo

References

External links
WBCN website

BCN (AM)
Beasley Broadcast Group radio stations
1984 establishments in Florida
Radio stations established in 1984
Sports radio stations in the United States
ESPN Radio stations